Mohammad Asif is a politician and minister from the Indian state of Tamil Nadu. He was elected to the Tamil Nadu legislative assembly as an Anna Dravida Munnetra Kazhagam candidate from Triplicane constituency in 1991 election. He served as rural industries minister in Jayalalitha cabinet formed after 1991 election.

See also
TANSI land acquisition case

References 

All India Anna Dravida Munnetra Kazhagam politicians
Tamil Nadu ministers
Living people
Year of birth missing (living people)
Tamil Nadu MLAs 1991–1996
Indian politicians convicted of corruption